Hennadiy Viktorovich "Gennady" Razin (born February 3, 1978) is a Ukrainian former professional ice hockey defenceman who last played for HC Donbass of the Kontinental Hockey League (KHL). He was selected by the Montreal Canadiens in the 5th round (122nd overall) of the 1997 NHL Entry Draft.

On May 1, 2013, HC Donbass of the KHL signed Razin to a one-year contract.

Career statistics

References

External links

1978 births
Ak Bars Kazan players
Amur Khabarovsk players
HC Donbass players
HC Dynamo Moscow players
HC Neftekhimik Nizhnekamsk players
Fredericton Canadiens players
Kamloops Blazers players
Living people
Montreal Canadiens draft picks
Quebec Citadelles players
Sportspeople from Kharkiv
Traktor Chelyabinsk players
Ukrainian ice hockey defencemen